Hen Bentref Llandegfan, often referred to by its shortened name the old village locally is a village in the  community of Cwm Cadnant, Ynys Môn, Wales, which is 128.9 miles (207.5 km) from Cardiff and 207.8 miles (334.3 km) from London. It is near Llandegfan.

"Hen Bentref" in Welsh means "the old village".

References

See also
List of localities in Wales by population

Villages in Anglesey